Martin John Lang (September 27, 1905—January 13, 1968) was a pitcher in Major League Baseball. He played for the 1930 Pittsburgh Pirates. He batted right-handed and threw left-handed. He was 5'11 and weighed 160 lbs (pounds). He attended Concordia University.

Lang was born on September 27, 1905, in Hooper, Nebraska, and died on January 13, 1968, in Lakewood, Colorado.

External links

1905 births
1968 deaths
Major League Baseball pitchers
Pittsburgh Pirates players
Concordia Golden Bears baseball players
Baseball players from New Mexico
People from Hooper, Nebraska